Indothais javanica is a species of sea snail, a marine gastropod mollusk, in the family Muricidae, the murex snails or rock snails.

Description
The length of the shell attains 26 mm.

Distribution
This marine species occurs off Western Australia.

References

javanica
Gastropods described in 1848